Dræet is a small Danish island off the northern coast of Funen and south of Æbelø, located in Nordfyn municipality. It has been uninhabited since 1960, but there are still remains of buildings on the island. It was purchased by the Aage V. Jensen Funds in 1995 and is protected.

References

Islands of Denmark
Geography of Nordfyn Municipality